Brunei and Canada established diplomatic relations in 1984. Brunei has a high commission in Ottawa, and Canada has a high commission in Bandar Seri Begawan.

History 
Diplomatic relations were established 7 May 1984 following Brunei's independence.

Economic relations 
In 2012, Canada's exports to Brunei amounted to $4.3 million with the most export are in machinery, while Brunei's exports to Canada totalled $6.7 million mainly in organic chemicals. The trade relationship includes commerce across a number of sectors and Brunei become a potential market for Canadian companies particularly in oil and gas sectors, information and communication technologies (ICT), agriculture and agri-food, environment, aerospace and education. Other Canadian companies also has shown interest in investment.

Further reading 
 Going Global: Brunei/Canada Relations in 2003

References 

 
Canada
Bilateral relations of Canada
Brunei and the Commonwealth of Nations
Canada and the Commonwealth of Nations